Libby Dam is a concrete gravity dam in the northwestern United States, on the Kootenai River in northwestern Montana.

Lake Koocanusa was named for the treaty that was developed between the Kootenai Indians, the Canadian government, and the U.S. government to build the dam and form the  It was the fourth dam constructed under the Columbia River Treaty. The Kootenai River is the third largest tributary to the Columbia River, contributing almost twenty percent of the total water in the lower Columbia.  Libby Dam has the capacity to hold back  of water.

The consulting architect for the project was Paul Thiry of Seattle, and the commission for its large granite bas-relief was awarded to sculptor Albert Wein by competition.

In order to make way for the dam, the town of Rexford was relocated and a new Flathead Railroad Tunnel  Construction began  and the reservoir was available for filling in mid-1973.

The dam is designed with a selective withdrawal system that allows water passage from various levels of Lake Koocanusa, which allows the operators to moderate water temperatures downstream. The river continues northwest into Idaho, past Bonners Ferry, to Kootenay Lake in Canada and joins the Columbia River.

Libby Dam's powerhouse contains five turbines and is capable of generating 600 megawatts. The electricity is managed by the Bonneville Power Administration and services eight states: Montana, Idaho, Washington, Wyoming, California, Utah, Oregon, and Nevada.  The money earned from electricity sales goes to the United States Treasury to repay the cost of building and operating Libby Dam.

President Gerald Ford was among the five thousand in attendance at the opening in 1975, along with Senator Mike Mansfield, the majority leader, and Governor Thomas Judge. At his first official event after a two-week vacation in Vail,  Ford "threw the switch" with Donald Macdonald, Canadian minister of energy.

See also

List of dams in the Columbia River watershed

References

External links
Libby Dam Home Page, Official Web Site Libby Dam, United States Army Corps of Engineers
Libby Dam, United States Army Corps of Engineers

Dams in Montana
Hydroelectric power plants in Montana
Buildings and structures in Lincoln County, Montana
United States Army Corps of Engineers dams
Energy infrastructure completed in 1975
Dams completed in 1975
Dams on the Kootenay River
Gravity dams
1975 establishments in Montana